Iraniyan is a 1999 Tamil language film directed by Vincent Selva. The film stars Murali and Meena, while Raghuvaran and Ranjith play other supporting roles. The film, which has music by Deva, released in November 1999. The film was a fictional biography of freedom fighter "Vattakudi Iraniyan" who fought for the welfare of the village.

Cast
Murali as Iraniyan
Meena as Ponni
Raghuvaran as Aande
Sriman as Iraniyan's Friend
Ranjith as Police Officer
Thalaivasal Vijay
Vadivelu as Chinnaswamy
Bala Singh
Ramji
Sanjeev as Iraniyan's brother
Delhi Ganesh as Ponni's Father
Mahanadhi Shankar
 C. R. Vijayakumari as Iraniyan's Mother
Ajay Rathnam as Aande's Son
Ambika as Aande's Wife
 S. N. Lakshmi

Soundtrack
The music composed by Deva.

Production
A legal suit was filed against the film's original title of Vaattaakkudi Iraniyan and subsequently the prefix was removed.

Release
The film received mixed reviews upon release, with a critic noting "ironically, the biggest problem with the movie is this emphasis on it being fictitious rather than real". A reviewer from ChennaiOnline.com noted "this is worth a watch. Murali performs with intensity and conviction." However Kalki praised the film for its realistic approach and cast.

References

1999 films
1990s Tamil-language films